National 3 may refer to:
Curriculum for Excellence, Scottish education
Championnat National 3, French football league